The Amersham Martyrs Memorial is a memorial to Protestant martyrs in Amersham, Buckinghamshire.

It was established in 1931 by The Protestant Alliance. The memorial was unveiled by a Mrs L. R. Raine, a direct descendant of martyr Thomas Harding, who is commemorated on the memorial. It is located near the Rectory or Parsonage Woods opposite Ruccles Field. Access is from a footpath from or a separate footpath from Station Road.

The memorial commemorates the deaths of seven local Protestant martyrs and Lollards (six men and one woman) who were burnt at the stake in 1506 and 1521. It also commemorates the deaths of three Amersham men who were burned elsewhere including Great Missenden, Smithfield, and Chesham between 1506 and 1532, as well as one Amersham man who was strangled to death at Woburn in 1514. According to the memorial's inscription, the children of William Tylsworth (-1506) and John Scrivener (-1521) were "compelled" to light the fire under their fathers' pyre. The memorial stands 100 yards from the site of the executions.

At the unveiling of the memorial in 1931 the assembled crowd was exhorted by a speaker to maintain "Protestant King on a Protestant throne and be ruled by a Protestant parliament". The chairman of the Protestant Alliance, Major Richard Rigg, delivered a speech at the unveiling of the memorial and the hymn "For All the Saints" was sung. In his 2019 book Sacred and Secular Martyrdom in Britain and Ireland since 1914, John Wolffe placed the creation of the memorial and others to martyrs in the context of memorials created in the aftermath of the First World War and their accompanying militaristic imagery.

A play about the martyrs, The Life and time of the Martyrs of Amersham and the Community in Which they Lived was staged by the local community in Amersham in March 2016.

Inscription

References

1931 establishments in England
1931 sculptures
Amersham
Cultural infrastructure completed in 1931
Lollard martyrs
Martyrs' monuments and memorials
Monuments and memorials in Buckinghamshire
Protestant martyrs of England
Religion in Buckinghamshire